Devdas Bhattacharya is a Bangladeshi police officer and the Deputy Inspector Genera of Mymensingh Range. He is the former Deputy Inspector General of Rangpur Range of Bangladesh Police.

Career 
Bhattacharya served in the Criminal Investigation Department in 2001. During the 2001 to 2006 Bangladesh Nationalist Party rule, the government discriminated against Police officers from Faridpur District, Gopalganj District, and religious minority communities as they were viewed as being loyal to the opposition Awami League. Bhattacharya as a Hindu was denied promotion three times and posted to Police Training Centre, Khulna. He was afterwards posted to the Criminal Investigation Department. He was then posted to Range Reserve Force (RRF), Sylhet.

Bhattacharya was the Superintendent of Police of Barisal District in October 2011.

Bhattacharya was the Superintendent of Police of Bandarban District in 2014. He inaugurated a school by the JAAGO Foundation along with Brigadier General Nakib Ahmed Chowdhury and Bohmong king U Chaw Prue Choudhury. He announced that the police have implemented the government decision to impose restrictions on the movement of foreigners in Bandarban District.

In June 2016, Bhattacharya was the additional commissioner (crime and operation) of the Chittagong Metropolitan Police. He supervised the investigation in the murder of Mahmuda Khanam Mitu, wife of Babul Akter, Superintendent of Police, after she was killed in Chittagong.

He led the drive in February 2018 to arrest Masukur Rahman Mashuk, organizing secretary of Bangladesh Nationalist Party. He detained a Bangladesh Jatiotabadi Chatra Dal, the student front of Bangladesh Nationalist Party, in March from the premises of the Jatiya Press Club. In July 2018, Bhattacharya was the additional commissioner of Dhaka Metropolitan Police. He saw the arrest of nine of fake members of Detective Branch. His team arrested a leader of the 2018 Bangladesh Quota Reform Movement.  A man, Aslam, died in custody of Detective Branch under his command.

In September 2020, Bhattacharya was the Deputy Inspector General of Rangpur Range. The Upazila Nirbahi Officer Wahida Khanam of Ghoraghat Upazila was attacked and Bhattacharya commanded the police force in the region that investigated the incident.

In April 2022, Bhattacharya submitted his investigation of Detective Branch officers who had accused of filing a false case over forged currency against hoteliers in Dhaka in November 2016. He was the additional commissioner of the Detective Branch at the time. The first police report Additional Deputy Commissioner Mohammad Shahed Miah of Dhaka Metropolitan Police in charge of cantonment zone had submitted the report in favor of the accused. Detective Branch mentioned they detained the two hoteliers from Fakirapool kitchen market with fake currency but CCTV footage showed they were detained from their hotel. In July 2022, Bhattacharya was made the Deputy Inspector Genera of Mymensingh Range and Abdul Alim Mahmud replaced him as Deputy Inspector General of Rangpur Range.

References 

Living people
Bangladeshi police officers
Criminal Investigation Department (Bangladesh) officers
Year of birth missing (living people)